Obaid Haroon (born 2 December 1986) is an Indian cricketer.

He is a right-handed wicket-keeper batsman who can open the batting for Jammu and Kashmir cricket team. He first came to the domestic team in October 2009 in a T20 team. He was re-introduced to team December 2012.

In November 2013, Haroon took five catches in Kerala's first innings, the first time he has collected five dismissals in his first-class career from eight matches.

References

Living people
1986 births
Indian cricketers
Jammu and Kashmir cricketers
Wicket-keepers